Juan Antonio Valencia (born 11 August 1929) is a Salvadoran former sports shooter. He competed at the 1968 Summer Olympics and the 1972 Summer Olympics.

References

External links
 

1929 births
Possibly living people
Salvadoran male sport shooters
Olympic shooters of El Salvador
Shooters at the 1968 Summer Olympics
Shooters at the 1972 Summer Olympics
Sportspeople from San Salvador